Wilfried is a masculine German given name derived from Germanic roots meaning "will" and "peace" (Wille and Frieden in German). The English spelling is Wilfrid. Wilfred and Wifred (also Wifredo) are closely related to Wilfried with the same roots (Old English wil and frið).

People using the name Wilfried as a given name:
 Murad Wilfried Hofmann (1931–2020), German diplomat
 Wilfried Behre (born 1956), German artist
 Wilfried Benjamin Balima (born 1985), Burkinabé footballer
 Wilfried Bingangoye (born 1985), Gabonese sprinter
 Wilfried Bock (21st century), German biathlete
 Wilfried Böse (1949–1976), German terrorist
 Wilfried Brauer (1937–2014), German computer scientist
 Wilfried Brookhuis (born 1961), Dutch footballer
 Wilfried Cretskens (born 1976), Belgian cyclist
 Wilfried Daim (1923–2016), Austrian psychologist
 Wilfried Dalmat (born 1982), French footballer
 Wilfried David (1946–2015), Belgian cyclist
 Wilfried Dietrich (1933–1992), German wrestler
 Wilfried Domoraud (born 1988), French footballer
 Wilfried Erdmann (born 1940), German sailor
 Wilfried Gröbner (born 1949), German footballer
 Wilfried Hannes (born 1957), German footballer
 Wilfried Hartung (born 1953), German swimmer
 Wilfried Herling (1920–1943), German pilot
 Wilfried Huber (born 1970), Italian luger
 Wilfried Klaus (born 1941), German actor
 Wilfried Kohlars (1939–2019), German footballer
 Wilfried Lemke (born 1946), United Nations official
 Wilfried Maaß (1931–2005), German politician
 Wilfried Martens (1936–2013), Belgian politician
 Wilfried Nelissen (born 1970), Belgian cyclist
 Wilfried Niflore (born 1981), French footballer
 Wilfried Pallhuber (born 1967), Italian biathlete
 Wilfried Paulsen (1828–1901), German chess player
 Wilfried Peeters (born 1964), Belgian cyclist
 Wilfried Puis (1943–1981), Belgian footballer
 Wilfried Richter (1916-1981), German military officer
 Wilfried Sanou (born 1984), Burkinabé footballer
 Wilfried Sauerland (born 1940), German boxing promoter
 Wilfried Schmid (born 1943), German-American mathematician
 Wilfried Soltau (1912–1995), German canoeist
 Wilfried Stephan (born 1955), German canoeist
 Wilfried Strik-Strikfeldt (1896–1977), German soldier
 Wilfried Tekovi (born 1989), Togolese footballer
 Wilfried Thurner (born 1927), Austrian bobsledder
 Jo-Wilfried Tsonga, French tennis player
 Wilfried Urbain Elvis Endzanga (born 1980), Congolese footballer
 Wilfried Van Moer (born 1945), Belgian footballer
 Wilfried Zaha (born 1992), Ivorian-born footballer

People using the name Wilfried as a surname:
 Bonno Wilfried (born 1989), Ivorian football player

See also
 Wilfred (given name)
 Wilfredo
 Wilf

English masculine given names
Masculine given names
German masculine given names
English given names